Joe Jackson (born 1955) is an American author of seven nonfiction books, including The Thief at the End of the World: Rubber, Power, and the Seeds of Empire, (a Time magazine Top Ten Books of 2008 selection) and Black Elk: The Life of an American Visionary, which was first published by Macmillan imprint Farrar, Straus and Giroux in 2016

His book Black Elk received multiple awards and acclaimed reviews, including the PEN/Jacqueline Bograd Weld Award for Biography and won the Society of American Historians' Francis Parkman Prize.

In 2016, Jackson was named the Mina Hohenberg Darden Professor of Creative Writing at Old Dominion University in Norfolk, Virginia.  He was preceded by Philip Roth author Blake Bailey.

Awards and honors 
 Edgar Allan Poe Award for Best Fact Crime nomination for Leavenworth Train, 2002
 National Book Critics Circle Award for Biography nomination for Black Elk, 2016
 Francis Parkman Prize for Black Elk, 2017
 PEN/Jacqueline Bograd Weld Award for Biography for Black Elk, 2017

Bibliography 
Non-fiction books
 Dead Run: The Shocking Story of Dennis Stockton and Life on Death Row in America with William Burke Jr. (Canongate, 1999, ; reprint: Times/Henry Holt, 1999)
 Leavenworth Train: A Fugitive's Search for Justice in the Vanishing West (Basic Books, 2001)
 A Furnace Afloat: The Wreck of the Hornet and the Harrowing 4,300-mile of its Survivors (Weidenfeld & Nicolson, 2003, ; also Free Press, 2003)
 A World on Fire: A Heretic, an Aristocrat, and the Race to Discover Oxygen (Viking, 2005)
 The Thief at the End of the World: Rubber, Power, and the Seeds of Empire (Viking, 2008,  (e-book))
 Atlantic Fever: Lindbergh, His Competitors, and the Race to Cross the Atlantic (Farrar, Straus and Giroux, 2012)
 Black Elk: The Life of an American Visionary (Farrar, Straus and Giroux, 2016)

Novels
 How I Left the Great State of Tennessee and Went on to Better Things (Carroll and Graf, 2004,

References

External links 
 

1955 births
21st-century American non-fiction writers
American male non-fiction writers
American non-fiction crime writers
Living people
Old Dominion University faculty